Raviv Drucker (born September 11, 1970) is an Israeli journalist, political commentator and investigative reporter.

Journalistic career

Early years
Drucker began his journalistic career as a general reporter, and later on a real-estate and infrastructure reporter in Maariv newspaper. In 1997 he was promoted to be the newspaper's chief political reporter. In 1998 he became the political and diplomatic correspondent for Galei Tzahal (Israel's Army Radio), where he also occasionally hosted the daily "Ma Bo'er" (What's Hot) news broadcast.

In the 2002/3 academic year Drucker was a Nieman Fellow at Harvard University.

Channel 10
After returning to Israel, Drucker became Channel 10's political commentator. He was later the co-presenter of the Channel's Friday evening news program together with Ofer Shelah. In 2009 he became the host of Hamakor ("the Source"), the Channel's investigative reporting magazine. He co-hosted the show together with Shelah, who was replaced by Mickey Rosenthal when Shelah decided to join politics. Rosenthal himself later joined Israeli politics and was replaced as Drucker's co-host by Razi Barkai. Both Shelah and Rosenthal were elected to the Knesset in the 2013 elections.

Select journalistic achievements
Drucker is responsible for unearthing several high-profile scandals in Israeli politics, that were a result of his investigations.

Three weeks before the 2006 elections, he exposed the "Omri Diary", the schedule of Omri Sharon, son of Israel's late Prime-Minister Ariel Sharon and a Knesset member himself. The papers detailed political appointments orchestrated by Sharon jr.

On June 15, 2007, three days after the primary elections for chairperson of the Israeli Labor Party, Drucker aired candid camera footage showing the faking of ballots results, a report which led to a police investigation.

Another police investigation was the result of his publication of leaked documents from Ehud Olmert's office as Israel's Prime Minister, documenting various promises to members of the Likud convention.

In 2008 Drucker published a series of reports on travels of Benjamin Netanyahu as a Knesset member, with his wife to London. According to the reports, these travels were paid for by private donors and included ostentatious accommodation, and were not properly approved of by the Knesset Ethics' committee. PM associates accused Drucker of applying a double standard, and the Netanyahus filed a libel suit against Drucker, which they later withdrew. The scandal is known in Israeli politics as "Bibi tours" (Bibi is the Nickname for Netanyahu). It was later reported that Netanyahu aides tied government willingness to postpone collection of Channel 10 debts to the state, which threatened its existence, to a demand to fire Drucker. In January 2015 Drucker published a draft of the State Comptroller's report on the matter, which according to the publication raises suspicion of compromised integrity.

In 2014 Drucker ran a series of investigative reports on the Jewish National Fund a non-profit organization owning 13% of total land in Israel, documenting questionable agreements with politicians and media outlets and politically motivated  allocations of major sums to projects with allegedly little connection to the organization's declared goals.

Clash with Prime Minister Netanyahu 
In October and November 2016 Drucker published a series of investigative reports related to Israel's PM, Benjamin Netanyahu. The one that drew the most attention argued that Netanyahu's personal lawyer and second cousin, David Shimron, represented a German submarine manufacturer in a multi-million dollar deal with Israel, alleging possible conflict of interest. Another report alleged that Netanyahu's son, Yair Netanyahu, received valuable gifts from Australian billionaire James Packer, and triggered a police investigation. Netanyahu responded with fierceful attacks on Drucker in his personal Facebook account, accusing him of "morbid and obsessive pursuit of the prime minister" and his family, and framing his channel 10 as "radical left-wing".

Public activity
In 2004 Drucker founded the Movement for Freedom of Information in Israel. He served as its chairman through December 2016.

Books
Drucker is the author of two books: Harakiri about the period of Ehud Barak's government, and Boomerang, which he wrote together with Ofer Shelah, about "the failure of Israeli leadership during the second Intifada".

Awards

 2008 OMETZ award (Citizens for Good Governance and Social Justice)
 2011 Sokolov Award
 2012 Transparency International (TI)(Israel) Award
 2016 "Knight of Good Governance" Award (awarded to "The Movement for Freedom of Information" headed by Raviv Drucker"

Education and personal life
Drucker holds a law degree from Tel Aviv University and studied Political Science at Bar-Ilan University. He was a basketball player and coach in the Israeli minor league. His brother, Sharon Drucker, is a professional basketball coach.

He lives with his partner, TV director Anat Goren, and their four sons in Tel Aviv-Yafo.

References

External links
 Drucker10.net – Drucker's personal website
 English Translation of select chapters from Harakiri – Drucker's book on Ehud Barak as Israeli PM.
 Hamakor – Investigative reporting TV magazine
 Interview with Secretary of State Condoleezza Rice
 The Movement for Freedom of Information in Israel
 Sharon at War – A review of Boomerang: The Failure of Leadership in the Second Intifada.
 The Israeli Journalist Incurring the Wrath of Netanyahu

Tel Aviv University alumni
Bar-Ilan University alumni
Israeli Jews
Israeli journalists
Israeli bloggers
1970 births
Living people
Israeli people of Indian-Jewish descent